Thelastomatidae is a family of nematodes belonging to the order Oxyurida.

Genera
The Global Biodiversity Information Facility (GBIF) currently recognizes 44 genera in this family:
 Aoruroides Travassos & Klos, 1958
 Aorurus Leidy, 1849
 Bilobostoma Jex, Schneider, Rose & Cribb, 2005
 Blaberinema Garcia & Coy, 1998
 Blatticola Schwenck, 1926
 Blattophila Cobb, 1920
 Blazionema Kloss, 1966
 Cameronia Basir, 1948
 Cephalobellus Cobb, 1920
 Cordonicola Ali & Farooqui, 1969
 Coronostoma Rao, 1958
 Corpicracens Jex, Schneider, Rose & Cribb, 2006
 Corydiella Rao & Rao
 Cranifera Kloss, 1960
 Davenema Mohagan & Spiridonov, 2017
 Desmicola Basir, 1956
 Euryconema Chitwood, 1932
 Fontonema Chitwood, 1930
 Galebia Chitwood, 1932
 Galinanema Spiridonov, 1984
 Geoscaphenema Jex, Schneider, Rose & Cribb, 2006
 Golovatchinema Spiridonov, 1984
 Gryllophila Basir, 1942
 Hammerschmidtiella Chitwood, 1932
 Jaidenema Jex, Schneider, Rose & Cribb, 2006
 Johnstonia Basir, 1966
 Leidynema Schwench, 1929
 Leidynemella Chitwood & Chitwood, 1934
 Malaspinanema Jex, Schneider, Rose & Cribb, 2006
 Paleothelastoma Poinar, 2011
 Paracameronia De Carvalho & Spiridonov, 1991
 Propharyngodon Biswas & Chakravarty
 Protrellima Gambhir & Chinglenkhomba
 Pseudodesmicola Jex, Schneider, Rose & Cribb, 2006
 Robertia Travassos & Kloss, 1960
 Schwenckiana Kloss, 1966
 Severianoia (Schwench, 1926) Travassos, 1929
 Stauratostoma Phillips, Pivar, Sun, Moulton & Bernard, 2018
 Suifunema Chitwood, 1932
 Tetleyus Dale, 1964
 Thelastoma Leidy, 1849
 Traklosia Bernard & Phillips, 2015
 Tsuganema Jex, Schneider, Rose & Cribb, 2005
 Wetanema Dale, 1967

References

Nematodes